Pied Piper Comics was a short-lived American comic book publishing company that operated from 1986 to 1988. The company was founded by Mark L. Hamlin and Roger McKenzie, with writer/editor David Campiti playing a major role.

Origins 
According to David Campiti, Pied Piper's origins were tied to two other publishers with which he was associated at the time: Amazing (full name: Amazing Publishing Company) and Wonder Comics, both of which were financed by comics distributor Scott Mitchell Rosenberg and a small group of investors. The plan was that Campiti would package comics for all three publishers through his studio Campiti and Associates, with Pied Piper handling "special projects such as posters and graphic novels; black-and-white [comics] were Amazing's domain, and Wonder Color would product strictly color comics."

Hamlin previously worked as a sales and marketing representative for Comico: The Comic Company; Pied Piper Comics was a play on Hamlin's name and the legend of the Pied Piper of Hamelin. McKenzie was a comics writer most well-known for his prior work for Marvel Comics.

Overview 
Hamlin, McKenzie, and Campiti shared the title of Publisher of Pied Piper Comics, with Campiti also holding the title of Editor-in-Chief. Hamlin was Financial Manager and McKenzie was Managing Editor. The company's business offices were in Wyoming, Michigan, while its editorial offices were in Camptiti's hometown of Wheeling, West Virginia.

Campiti personally edited most of the publisher's comics as well as writing a number of titles.

Pied Piper temporarily acquired David Lawrence & Ron Lim's Ex-Mutants after the title began with two publishers associated with Campiti and financial backer Rosenberg: Eternity Comics and Amazing. Campiti left Rosenberg's various ventures in 1987, taking Lawrence & Lim's Ex-Mutants with him to Pied Piper. The company also published Lawrence & Lim's The New Humans.

Demise 
Pied Piper collapsed in 1988, with a number of titles, such as Hero Alliance and Power Factor, being continued by Campiti's own publishing venture, Innovation Publishing; while Ex-Mutants and The New Humans both returned to Eternity (which at that point was an imprint of another Rosenberg operation, Malibu Comics).

Titles
 Beast Warriors of Shaolin:
 Pied Piper Graphic Album #1 (1986)
 vol. 1,  #1–3 (1987)
 Ex-Mutants:
 Lawrence & Lim's Ex-Mutants vol. 1, #6–8 (1987) — acquired from Amazing; later acquired by Eternity Comics
 Lawrence & Lim's Ex-Mutants Microseries: Erin #1 (1987)
 Lawrence & Lim's The New Humans #1–3 (1987) — later acquired by Eternity Comics
 Hero Alliance: End of the Golden Age (1986), Pied Piper Graphic Album #1 — collected material from Sirius Comics, later acquired by Wonder Comics, and then Innovation Publishing
 Mr. Doom (1987)
 Phigments #2 (1987) — series acquired from Amazing Comics
 Power Factor #2 (1987) — series acquired from Wonder Comics, then continued by Innovation Publishing

References

Notes

Sources 
 

1986 establishments in Michigan
1988 disestablishments
Defunct comics and manga publishing companies
Publishing companies established in 1986
Publishing companies disestablished in 1988